Ghana competed at their twelfth games in Manchester sending 22 athletes  in mixed teams in athletics, badminton and weightlifting and sent all male teams to compete in boxing and judo. Despite this strong team, the only medal won was a bronze in the Women's Heptathlon. A poor showing by Ghana's high standards of the past.

Medals

Bronze
Athletics:
 Margaret Simpson — Women's Heptathlon

See also
2002 Commonwealth Games results

References

2002
2002 in Ghanaian sport
Nations at the 2002 Commonwealth Games